The 2017 Vodafone Gold Coast 600 was a motor racing event for the Supercars Championship, held on the weekend of 20 to 22 October 2017. The event was held at the Gold Coast Street Circuit in Surfers Paradise, Queensland and consisted of two races, 300 kilometres in length. It is the twelfth event of fourteen in the 2017 Supercars Championship and hosted Races 21 and 22 of the season.

Background

Driver changes
Ashley Walsh, having withdrawn from the Bathurst 1000 due to injury, was again replaced by Andre Heimgartner.

Results

Race 21
Race

Race 22
Race

References

Gold Coast 600
Gold Coast 600